3C Institute is a private, for-profit research and development company based in Durham, North Carolina which develops "web- and game-based applications and technology solutions designed to improve the health and well-being of youth and families." The company partners with researchers, program providers, non-profits, and companies to develop customized digital information delivery systems, such as personalized games, e-training courses, and web-based assessments. 3C Institute also develops evidence-based social emotional learning products for children, adolescents, and parents.

Background 
3-C Institute for Social Development was founded in 2001 by clinical psychologist Dr. Melissa DeRosier. The organization changed its name to 3C Institute in 2013. Dr. DeRosier received her doctorate from UNC-Chapel Hill in 1992 and completed a two-year fellowship at Duke University Medical Center. She then worked on a five-year federal grant examining bullying and violence prevention in the Wake County Public School System. She observed that teachers and schools were using non-evidence-based programs to improve social and emotional skills and founded the company to address this research-to-practice gap. The company sought Small Business Innovation Research (SBIR) funding for the development of its products. Since 2001, the company has expanded to 75 employees and received $25 million in SBIR funding from agencies such as the U.S. Department of Education, National Institutes of Health, and the Centers for Disease Control and Prevention. A corporate spin-off, Personalized Learning Games, was founded in 2014 to commercialize 3C Institute's social-emotional learning games.

Awards 
3C Institute was recognized with the U.S. Small Business Administration’s Tibbetts Award in 2011 and received a special Award of Excellence for Innovation and Social Entrepreneurship in 2014 from the U.S. Small Business Administration, which highlights entrepreneurs who find unique and novel solutions to social problems.

Products and Services 
3C Institute has developed web- and game-based interventions to address children and adolescents’ behavioral and social problems. The company’s flagship product, Social Skills Group Intervention (S.S.GRIN), received recognition from the Substance Abuse and Mental Health Services Administration (SAMHSA) as a mental health promotion winner in 2010. The effectiveness of S.S.GRIN was proven by tracking 1,500 students over three years in 10 schools. S.S.GRIN for High-Functioning Autism is listed in SAMHSA’s National Registry of Evidence-based Programs and Practices  and the National Autism Network.

In November 2014, the company released Zoo U, an evidence-based social-emotional learning and assessment game for elementary school students. The game was developed with SBIR funding and received a Games for Change nomination for "Most Significant Impact" in 2015. 

3C Institute is developing other social-emotional learning games including Stories in Motion, intended for elementary school students with high-functioning autism, and Hall of Heroes, intended for middle school students.

3C Institute also works with outside clients to develop programs to help researchers collect and translate data better. 3C has developed training models for school psychologists and others to help them apply the interventions more accurately and effectively. A notable project has been the Student Curriculum on Resilience Education (SCoRE), which helps first-year college students adjust to the unique stresses of college life and was created in partnership with Leading Education and Awareness for Depression (LEAD).

References

External links 

Companies established in 2001
Companies based in Durham, North Carolina